The Indian High Courts Act 1911 was an Act of British Parliament ratified on the 18th of August 1911 to amend the High Courts Act of 1861. Notable changes to existing legislation include an increase in the number of judges of high court as well as the ability of government to establish additional high courts across British India.

Sections

§ 1 - Increased number of Judges of High Court 

The maximum number of judges to serve an Indian High Court was increased from sixteen to twenty. Previously enacted regulations, such as those set forth by §2 of the Indian High Courts Act, remained in effect.

§ 2 - Power to establish additional High Courts 

The powers granted to His Majesty the King under §16 of the Indian High Courts Act were expanded to allow for the establishment of additional High Courts across British India. Previously, only four courts had been established. Incidental, consequential or supplemental alterations to local or existing jurisdictions were to be made by means of order or patent so as to ensure the administrative superintendence of the newly established High Courts. Here, too, previously enacted regulations remained in effect.

§ 3 - Power to appoint Temporary Judges 

Subject to the provisions of §2 of the Indian High Courts Act, as amended by this Act, it was to be lawful for the Governor General in Council to appoint additional judges to High Courts ″as required by necessity or circumstance.″ Whilst appointed for no more than two years, temporary judges were to be granted powers no different from those allowed to the judges appointed by the monarch.

§ 4 - Salaries 

The salaries of any judges or temporary judges appointed under this Act were to be paid out of the Revenues of India.

§ 5 - Short Title 

This Act was to be cited as the Indian High Courts Act, 1911. Together with the Acts of 1861 and 1865, this Act was to be cited as the Indian High Courts Act, 1861 to 1911.

Supplemental Notes

Legislation Referenced 

The Indian High Courts Act, 1861

§2 specified the qualifications and salaries of judges serving the High Courts.

§15 established High Courts' measures of administrative superintendence over the courts subject to their appellate jurisdiction.

§16 granted His Majesty the King the power to establish an additional High Court at Allahabad.

References

United Kingdom Acts of Parliament 1911
1911 in British India